Jacob Gil is an Israeli architect and town planner

Biography
Gil studied in the Technion – Israel Institute of Technology in Haifa and graduated with honors in 1961.

After graduating, he moved to Denmark and participated in the planning of the Albertslund neighborhood, in the suburbs of Copenhagen.

Later on, he worked in Lufenfeld-Gemerman's office (of architects Moshe Lufenfeld & Giora Gemerman) and Yaski-Alexandroni's office, a period during which he focused mainly on the planning of dwellings, town planning and hospitals.

Early in his career, he worked in partnership with architect Eli Lipsky. During this collaboration Gil and Lipsky have participated in public competitions and in the planning of educational institutions and dwellings.

In 1970, Jacob Gil became a partner in the Yaski-Gil-Sivan office.
During these 20 years of partnership, Gil was responsible for the planning of new towns and neighborhoods, university campuses, rehabilitation centers, hospitals, sports facilities, public institutions, office buildings, shopping malls, research & development facilities, hotels and thousands apartments both conventional and industrialized.

In 1990 he established the architecture firm Gil Architects, along with his wife, the interior designer Michal Oren.
The office's work includes the planning of hospitals, laboratories, medical centers, museums, office buildings, shopping malls, villas etc.

Awards
Gil won  architectural awards with A.Yaski: 
 (named after Eliezer Kaplan), for the planning of the Eisenberg hospital, Jaffa (1976).

Professional achievements

Since 1990, as director of Gil Architects with Michal Oren
 Master plan north Netanya, Kiryat Sanz
 170 housing units for young couples, Netanya
 R&D facility for EMC Corporation, Tel Aviv
 Commercial center, Pardes Hanna
 Senior citizens complex, Tel Aviv
 Shalvata psychiatric hospital, Hod Hasharon
 180 housing units for young couples, Beit Shemesh
 Medical center, Savyon
 500 housing units for Minrav ltd, El'ad
 Kazin center - hi-tec facilities, Ra'anana
 Religious community center, Netanya
 Central laboratories for the Israeli Ministry of Health, Jerusalem
 Home for life for autistic children, Ra'anana
 Private villa, Tel Aviv
 SPHERA design center, Bucharest, Romania
 Jerusalem Psychiatric Center - master plan, Jerusalem
 Jerusalem Psychiatric Center - patients wards, Jerusalem
 Museum of Yemenite Jewish heritage, Rehovot
 Hartzfeld rehabilitation hospital, Gedera - general upgrading
 Shalvata psychiatric hospital - 3 wards, Hod Hasharon
 Yoseftal Medical Center-emergency+master plan, Eilat
 120 housing units, Kfar Saba
 City center master plan, Ra'anana
 Prestigious villas, Ra'anana, Even Yehuda

1970-1990 as partner at Yaski-Gil-Sivan architects & town planners
 Orek office building, Ramat Gan
 Negev shopping Mall, Beersheba
 Ocean dwelling tower, Herzliya
 Tel Aviv University Electronic labs, Tel Aviv
 Dekel country club, Tel Aviv
 Aizenberg Hospital, Jaffa, (Kaplan prize)
 Ben Gurion university Engineering department, Beersheba
 Israel Electric Company head office, Tel Aviv
 Capital city of Nigeria, Quarters I,J,K,N, Abuja, Nigeria
 IBM Israel office tower, Tel Aviv
 Lowenstein Rehabilitation Hospital, Ra'anana
 Hebrew University Sinatra students center, Jerusalem
 Beit Halohem war veterans Rehabilitation Center, Tel aviv, (Rokach prize)
 Tel Aviv University - students dormitories, Tel Aviv

Before 1970
 , Gedera, planning with Yaski, at the end of 1960s

References

 Sharon Rotbard, Avraham Yasky, Concrete Architecture (Hebrew אברהם יסקי, אדריכלות קונקרטית), Tel Aviv: Babel, 2007

Living people
Israeli architects
Technion – Israel Institute of Technology alumni
Year of birth missing (living people)